Hempton is a village and a civil parish in the English county of Norfolk. The village straddles the A1065 between Fakenham and Swaffham. The nearest railway station is at Sheringham for the Bittern Line which runs between Sheringham, Cromer and Norwich. The nearest airport is Norwich International Airport.

The village's name means 'Hemma's farm/settlement'.

The Church of the Holy Trinity was built in 1856 by John Henry Hakewill for the Reverend Charles St. Denys Moxon. This church is an important example of a small rural building emerging directly from the Oxford Movement. It has a painted cross suspended above the high altar that was carved by a former Ukrainian prisoner of war. The building is Grade II listed.

References

http://kepn.nottingham.ac.uk/map/place/Norfolk/Hempton

North Norfolk
Villages in Norfolk
Civil parishes in Norfolk